James Nightingale (10 August 1840 – 9 February 1917) was an English cricketer. Nightingale's batting and bowling styles are unknown. He was born at Reigate, Surrey.

Nightingale made a single first-class appearance for Surrey in 1871 against Sussex at The Oval. In a match which Surrey won by seven wickets, Nightgale batted once in Surrey's first-innings, ending not out on 2. He also bowled four wicketless overs in Sussex's second-innings, conceding 8 runs. This was his only first-class appearance.

He died at the town of his birth on 9 February 1917.

References

External links
James Nightingale at ESPNcricinfo
James Nightingale at CricketArchive

1840 births
1917 deaths
People from Reigate
English cricketers
Surrey cricketers